Slobodan Miletić (born 19 August 1969) is a retired Serbian football midfielder.

References

1969 births
Living people
Sportspeople from Niš
Serbian footballers
FK Radnički Niš players
FK Partizan players
FK Borac Banja Luka players
IK Start players
OFK Beograd players
Athlitiki Enosi Larissa F.C. players
R.W.D. Molenbeek players
Panetolikos F.C. players
Kozani F.C. players
Association football midfielders
Eliteserien players
Belgian Pro League players
Serbian expatriate footballers
Expatriate footballers in Norway
Serbian expatriate sportspeople in Norway
Expatriate footballers in Greece
Serbian expatriate sportspeople in Greece
Expatriate footballers in Belgium
Serbian expatriate sportspeople in Belgium